The British languages or a British language may refer to either:
 The Languages of the United Kingdom, including the island of Great Britain, (demonym British).
 British English, dialect of English and most spoken language in the United Kingdom.
 Brittonic languages, also known as the British Celtic languages, a branch of the Insular Celtic language family
 Common Brittonic, an ancient language, once spoken across Great Britain.
 Welsh language, spoken natively in Wales and the England-Wales border, is historically referred to in English as the British language (among other names).

See also
 Breton language, spoken in Brittany, France.

sd:برطانوي ٻوليون
ur:برطانوی زبانیں